ROD-188 is a sedative drug that was structurally derived from the GABAA antagonist bicuculline by a team at Roche. Unlike bicuculline, ROD-188 acts as an agonist at GABAA receptors, being a positive allosteric modulator acting at a novel binding site distinct from those of benzodiazepines, barbiturates or muscimol, with its strongest effect produced at the α6β2γ2 subtype of the GABAA receptor. ROD-188 is one of a number of related compounds acting at this novel modulatory site, some of which also act at benzodiazepine receptors.

See also 
 Bicuculline

References 

Sedatives
Tetrahydroisoquinolines
Tetrahydrofurans
Furanones
GABAA receptor positive allosteric modulators
GABAA-rho receptor negative allosteric modulators
p-Tosyl compounds
Sulfonamides